The Australian Greens is an Australian political party. It is a confederation, with a national organisation comprising a member body in each state and territory, as follows:

 Greens New South Wales
 Australian Greens Victoria
 Queensland Greens
 Greens Western Australia
 Greens South Australia
 Tasmanian Greens
 ACT Greens
 Northern Territory Greens

References

Australian Greens by state